Willians may refer to:

 Willians Bartolomeu dos Santos (born 1973), a Brazilian football player known as Willians
 Ilson Wilians Rodrigues (born 1979) Brazilian football player known as Ilson or Willians
 Willians Domingos Fernandes (born 1986), a Brazilian football player known as Willians
 Willians Santana (born 1988), a Brazilian football player known as Willians
 Willians Astudillo (born 1991), a Venezuelan baseball player
 Willians Mendez Suarez, a Cuban Anglican bishop

See also 
 Willian (disambiguation)
 William (disambiguation)
 Williams (disambiguation)